The Holden Commodore (VE) is an executive car that was produced by Holden from 2006 to 2013. It was the first iteration of the fourth generation of the Commodore. Its range included the luxury variants, Holden Berlina (VE) and Holden Calais (VE); utility models were included as the  Holden Ute (VE).

As opposed to the VZ and all models previous which used Opel-sourced platforms adapted both mechanically and in size for the local market, the whole-new VE programme is the first Commodore to be developed exclusively by Holden in Australia. Despite its status as an all-new model, engines—comprising the 3.6-litre V6 and more powerful 6.0-litre V8—have been largely carried over from the VZ series. Clever features to help minimise export redevelopment costs, such as a symmetrical centre console housing a flush-fitting hand brake lever, facilitated the conversion to left-hand drive. Internationally, the VE was badge engineered as the Chevrolet Lumina, Chevrolet Omega and Pontiac G8.

Holden implemented a staged roll-out of the VE variants, releasing the sedan first in July 2006. Prior to this, Holden stated they would manufacture two parallel generations of Commodores until the new station wagon and utility body styles were launched. Variants by Holden's performance vehicle partner, Holden Special Vehicles (HSV), were released soon after the sedan's debut alongside the long-wheelbase WM Statesman/Caprice models. The VE Ute did not enter production until 2007 when it was accompanied by the previewing of a Sportwagon concept. The Sportwagon itself was subsequently introduced in July 2008 with the standard Commodore wheelbase instead of the extended wheelbase of previous Commodore wagons.

Updates to the VE have come in the form of model year (MY) changes from early 2007 onwards. Typically subtle in nature, these recurring changes have involved alterations to colours and trim, increased standard equipment, and a reduction in fuel consumption. More noteworthy adjustments have come in the form of a smaller 3.0-litre V6 engine for entry-level versions and "Series II" styling revisions in late 2010.


Development 

Official manufacture of the sedan began at Holden's Elizabeth, South Australia production facility on 13 July 2006. Three days later, Holden publicly revealed the car at the Melbourne Convention Centre, broadcast simultaneously via the Internet. The launch occurred alongside that of the flagship WM Statesman/Caprice. Previous to this, Holden announced that VE station wagon and utility variants would be postponed and the VZ equivalents would remain in production. Sales of the VE Ute commenced on 22 August 2007. This was shortly followed by the unveiling of a Sportwagon concept, the production version of which was released in July 2008.

Sedan 
Holden's designers and engineers began laying down the basics of a clean-sheet Commodore sedan in 1999. In the seven years of development, the car came to be Holden's largest and most expensive project, representing an expenditure exceeding A$1 billion and 3.4 million kilometres (2.1 million miles) of testing.

In 1999 Peter Hughes, Holden's manager of exterior design, produced a two-dimensional image of a sketch drawn earlier by Michael Simcoe, Holden's design director at the time. Known in house as the "Bill of Design", the sketch formed the design basis for the production-ready car. Various elements of the sketch were changed, including the rear tail lamps, the low-profile side window cluster and the drawn out wheelbase, but the aggressive stance remained.

In 2004, just two years before the release of the VE Commodore, Holden unveiled the Torana TT36 concept car at the Australian International Motor Show in Sydney. The TT36 served as a preview of the VE and allowed Holden to gauge public reaction to its styling. Much of the Torana's styling drew on the essence of the VE's design. Some production-ready components even carried over from the TT36 including the steering wheel, the window and rear-view mirror switch cluster and the handbrake lever.

Shortly after stylists penned the first design sketches, Holden engineers began work on developing the chassis. Opel, which had provided the basis for all previous Commodore generations, ceased production of their rear-wheel drive Omega in 2003. This meant that Holden had two options: to use another GM platform, or to develop an all-new vehicle. GM's new premium rear-wheel drive Sigma platform was to see production in the 2002 Cadillac CTS. Holden's engineers were offered this platform, but decided it was not appropriate. The Sigma platform's double A-arm front suspension and extensive use of aluminium were too costly for the VE's market segment. The luggage compartment was deemed too small and the Sigma interior package could not be stretched sufficiently to become a family-sized car. In particular, the rear-seat shoulder width was too tight. These major drawbacks made Holden decide to develop an all-new platform, known as the GM Zeta platform, on which a number of forthcoming GM vehicles would also be based. The Zeta suspension system comprises new double-pivot MacPherson strut for the front and a four-link independent rear setup. These replace the previous simple MacPherson strut design front and much criticised semi-trailing arm rear suspension, for improved ride and handling.

Denny Mooney was appointed chairman of Holden on 1 January 2004, by which time development of the VE Commodore was well underway. Key design and engineering work was being finalised, and investment was already being made in making the tooling with which to manufacture the car. One of Mooney's priorities was to improve the perceived quality issues that surrounded the previous generations of Commodores. The interior quality benefited dramatically from this additional emphasis; Mooney pushed for panel gaps to be reduced by a further  over previous targets. Smaller panel gaps are just one of the ways that Holden have developed the VE to pitch it against the European competitors. Through the use of advanced steels and intensive design, the body structure is 50 percent stiffer than the outgoing model, benefiting from noise and vibration reductions, handling and crash safety. However the new body has resulted in substantially increased weight over the outgoing model.

The development of the new car led Holden to redesign the Elizabeth plant in South Australia so that entire sections of the car can be assembled off the foremost production line. This new production method allows for complete sub-sections like the engine and transmissions to be constructed seamlessly together on rigs that simplify production. This process is applied to the front-end module of the VE Commodore, consisting of the headlights, bumpers, airbag sensors and other accessory components. It can be easily removed as one-piece leading to lower repair costs and easier access to the engine bay. This design represents the first time such a method has been used within GM, and garnered the SAE Australasia's 2006 Automotive Engineering Excellence Award. A modular design structure known within Holden as "Flex Vision" has been applied to the interior where fundamentally different components such as audio units and instrument clusters can be swapped out for the different Commodore variants, creating radically varied interior look and feel without much higher costs. The upshot of this is much greater differentiation between the variants than the outgoing model creating three distinct interior looks, dubbed: Functional, Performance and Luxury. The closely related long-wheelbase WM Statesman/Caprice derivatives feature a fourth interior type referred to as Prestige.

Additional detail touches were added to the VE, such as a new four-strut hinge system for the boot to replace space intrusive, much maligned "gooseneck" hinges as used on previous Commodores. High-specification variants see expandable door pockets and a Saab-like "blackout" feature which illuminates only the speedometer at night to enhance driver focus on the road. An innovative flush-fitting handbrake set into a symmetrical centre console means the lever can be easily reversed to sit on the opposite side of console for left-hand drive export markets, minimising redesign costs.

Sportwagon 

Introduced in July 2008, the A$110 million VE Sportwagon programme represented a departure from previous Commodore station wagons. Holden was concerned that the traditional wagon market was being severely eroded by growing sport utility vehicle (SUV) sales and over-reliance on fleet purchasing. Up to 90 percent of VZ wagons were bought by fleet companies and Holden sought to attract more retail customers. The decision was made to develop a sportier, more stylish wagon as an alternative to SUVs. The Sportwagon, unlike the previous VZ wagon, which shared its long-wheelbase with the Statesman/Caprice is built on the same short-wheelbase platform as the sedan. This shift in thinking means cargo capacity is reduced from VZ's  but the sedan's near 50:50 weight distribution is retained. The Sportwagon is styled with an aggressively sloping rear profile. To ensure the cargo opening is sufficiently large with such a profile, the tailgate hinges part way up the roof line. The design of the tailgate is compact enough to open in just  of space, a publicised feature in Sportwagon television commercials.

Revisions were made to the suspension over the sedan's setup. These included stiffer springs, anti-roll bar changes and an additional ball-joint in the rear suspension to handle the extra load. Aggressive pricing means Sportwagon variants of each specification level receive a A$1,000 premium over the sedan and are cheaper than the outgoing VZ wagons.

Ute 

2007 saw the launch of the VE Ute, a coupe utility based on the VE Commodore. It was unveiled to the media in August, with showroom sales began later in the month. This generation of the Holden Ute is aimed as a "lifestyle vehicle", a shift from the traditional "workhorse" market. The VE series Ute was marketed as the Holden Ute rather than as the Holden Commodore Ute.

 Omega: The base model, having similar standard features to the Commodore Omega sedan but can carry more than the SS V, SS and SV6.
 SV6: A sportier version of the V6 Ute, the SV6 replaced the S-pack from previous models.
 SS V Redline (Series II):A performance version of the SS V offering Brembo brakes, 19-inch Alloy wheels, FE3 Super Sports Performance Suspension and a tyre inflater kit.
 SS V Z Series: A variant that combines luxury and sport features, sold in late 2012/early 2013. Standard features include: 19" forged alloy wheels, front Brembo brakes with red calipers, FE3 suspension, sunroof (Sedan only), Z series carpet mats, Z series badges, rear view camera, rear park assist, exterior chrome highlights, leather wrapped steering wheel, chrome highlights in instrument cluster.

Unlike the previous VU–VZ generation, no double-cab, cab-chassis or AWD variants are offered.

Safety 
Engine packaging became a contentious issue during development. Holden's designers wanted the engine positioned well behind the front axle to allow short overhangs and an overall sportier appearance, whereas the crash engineers were concerned that this would reduce the body's impact absorption in an accident. Negotiation between designers and crash engineers resulted in moving some of the engine components, including relocating the battery to the boot, freeing up valuable front-end space. By having the engine moved back and further down, the VE Commodore also benefits from near perfect 50:50 weight distribution across all variants, leading to superior handling. Crash engineers introduced several other safety initiatives, including relocating the fuel tank in front of the rear-axle line, instead of behind. A more crash-resistant rear-end was also seen as necessary. The design though had to incorporate a spacious boot and a spare-wheel bay that could house the largest-sized wheel to be fitted to the car. Crash test results from Australasian New Car Assessment Program (ANCAP) rate the VE lower in the offset frontal impact test than the previous generation Commodore. The overall crash score was marginally higher than the outgoing VZ, due to improvements in side impact protection giving a score of 27.45 out of 37 or a four star rating out of a possible five.

Holden's standardisation of six airbags in March 2008 for MY09 made the VE eligible for the ANCAP side pole test, yielding additional scoring points. The second stage of the VE's safety rollout in October 2008 for MY09.5 included the addition of an energy absorbing steering column shroud and redesigned rear door latches across the VE range. The inclusion of a seat belt reminder on the Omega sedan yielded another point, thus allowing the Omega sedan to score five-stars, or a score of 33.45 when tested the following December. The Omega Sportwagon was the next model to be awarded the full five stars the following February, following the addition of a seat belt reminder in Sportwagon production. The remaining VE models, including the Ute and WM Statesman/Caprice, which had already received most of the safety upgrades, received the seat belt reminder as standard fitment as of MY10 production from August 2009. As a result, all VE sedan and Sportwagon variants along with the extended length WM models received the five-star rating. The VE Ute officially received the rating on 19 October 2009, making the entire line-up of Australian-made Holdens five-star ANCAP rated.

Powertrains 

Holden, concerned about the risks of introducing a new platform and drivetrain at the same time, introduced the Australian-built Alloytec V6 engine in the proven VZ model. This allowed time to address any issues or faults before fitting it to the VE. The original base V6 benefited from power increases over the VZ, with engine noise reduced by using new timing chains among other modifications. An updated version of the long-serving four-speed GM 4L60-E automatic transmission remained for this engine. Manual transmission options are the Aisin AY6 and Tremec TR6060 six-speeder. Two automatics featuring Active Select; the five-speed GM 5L40-E and six-speed GM 6L80-E were also offered. The latter was reserved exclusively for a modified L76 V8 engine, giving an extra  of power compared to the VZ. This new engine designated L98 does not readily support fuel-saving Active Fuel Management technology, unlike the L76.

In October 2006, Holden introduced a bi-fuel version of the Alloytec V6, available to the Omega and Berlina. Able to run on both petrol and LPG, it features an advanced sequential vapour gas injection (SVGI) system and hardened valve seats to cope. Although LPG prices are lower, the engine uses a large  cylindrical gas tank which causes decreased boot space and slightly increased fuel consumption. Holden was able to take advantage of a loophole in government legislation, allowing an A$2,000 rebate on LPG installation because the unit is fitted post-production by Holden's customisation arm HSVi. Normally, people would only be entitled to a A$1,000 rebate for new cars pre-installed with LPG. Due to the possibility that these bi-fuel Commodores may have been fitted with undersized O-rings in the service valve hand tap, Holden issued a recall affecting the first 981 of these models on 10 April 2007. There were also two VE recalls previous to this. The initial 16 October 2006 recall affecting 1,521 V8 Commodore and WM Statesman/Caprice models involved a faulty fuel hose, causing a fuel smell to enter the cabin. A second 10 November 2006 recall affecting 12,830 Commodores and WM models built prior to 11 September 2006 resulted from defective rear seat belt anchors. On 7 December 2007, another recall was issued for over 86,000 VE and WM V6 models. This was due to the possibility that one of the fuel lines in the engine compartment may have a rub condition with a fuel vapour hose clip, possibly causing a fuel smell to become evident.

For the 2008 Australian International Motor Show in Sydney, Holden announced the MY09.5 upgrade involving the standardisation of the "premium" Alloytec V6 across the Commodore range from 1 November 2008, whereas previously it had been reserved for the SV6 and Calais. Omega and Berlina variants acquired variable valve timing, like the High Output engine, but not the "premium" dual exhaust system and the five-speed automatic transmission. These changes result in the base petrol V6 producing  less power and  less torque than the engine it replaces. However, Omega and Berlina sedans benefit from a two percent fuel efficiency improvement, or four percent for wagons. Additionally, emissions have also been reduced allowing petrol-powered variants to achieve Euro VI certification, a pending emission standard for European introduction in 2014. These changes extend further than the petrol engine as bi-fuel LPG variants benefit from an eight percent improvement in fuel economy when run on LPG.

Also announced at the 2008 motor show was a version of the 6.0-litre V8 engine fitted with Active Fuel Management (AFM) technology, known as the L76. The announcement of AFM coincided with the announcement of EcoLine, a badge highlighting Holden vehicles employing fuel saving technologies or those powered by fuels other than petrol. For the VE Commodore, both AFM and LPG-powered versions fall under the EcoLine umbrella. On 7 April 2009, Holden announced that dealerships were receiving their first deliveries of EcoLine-branded models, including the new L76 V8s.

On 4 August 2009, Holden announced the MY10 revisions to the VE and WM range to be released in September. For the VE Omega and Berlina, the 3.6-litre Alloytec V6 has been downsized to 3.0-litres, the lowest engine displacement of a Commodore since the straight-six engine fitted to the 1986 VL series. This smaller capacity engine features Spark Ignition Direct Injection (SIDI) technology, and is officially claimed to reduce fuel consumption by up to 12 percent depending on the variant. Other than the manual transmission version of the SV6, all SIDI V6 models are coupled to GM's 6L50 automatic and fall under Holden's EcoLine banner. Benefits to fuel economy for the 3.6-litre SIDI can also be attributed to an improved "deceleration fuel cut" system, which terminates the fuel supply during engine coasting; a higher efficiency alternator and voltage regulator; a 50 rpm lower idle speed (to 550 rpm); and a new "turbine damper" for the automatic transmission that works to suppress vibrations at low rpms, thus enabling earlier upshifts. Omega versions of the Ute and all bi-fuel versions retain the existing 3.6-litre and four-speed automatic combination, although the LPG engine has been tweaked for further efficiency gains.

Further powertrain improvement came in September 2010 with the MY11 upgrades. Omega versions of the Ute were upgraded to the 3.0-litre SIDI engine with six-speed automatic transmission as used in the sedan and wagons versions. Holden also modified both the 3.0-litre V6 and 6.0-litre V8 engines to accept E85 bio-ethanol in addition to petrol. Holden claims that running either engine on E85 provides a sizeable increase in performance and reduces  emissions between 20 and 40 percent, depending on the distance the fuel is transported from the production site to the filling station. E85 compatibility extended to the 3.6-litre V6 as part of the MY12 update in September 2011.

Models

Commodore Omega 
Replacing both the outgoing Commodore Executive and Acclaim (nameplates introduced in 1983 and 1993, respectively), the Omega offers a halfway point in terms of equipment levels. The most significant gain over the Executive is the electronic stability control system (Bosch version 8.0) now standard across the range. Like all VE models, the Omega uses a "space saver" spare tyre, which has come under scrutiny. Concerns have been raised by the public over its usefulness in remote Australian outback areas, far from any tyre repair centres and asserts that it is a cost-cutting measure. Similar concerns have been raised in the media, although Holden maintains that this is a weight-saving feature and allows for full-size spare tyres to be purchased at an additional cost. Likewise, critics found the omission of standard air conditioning for the Omega model unforgivable, given both the overall hot Australian climate, and the cost of the car. This, however, was rectified in the MY09 upgrade of the Omega (see below).

Holden have offered five limited edition models based on the Commodore Omega:
 V-Series: introduced in October 2006, the Commodore V featured air conditioning, a sports-oriented body kit including 17-inch alloy wheels, a rear spoiler and colour-matched wing mirrors and exterior door handles.
 Lumina: debuted in June 2007 with a luxury theme including the Berlina grille and the original Calais V seven-spoke alloy wheels. Specified identically to the V-Series with exception to the rear spoiler, the Lumina saw the addition of rear parking sensors and Bluetooth connectivity.
 60th Anniversary: released on 1 May 2008 to commemorate the 60th anniversary of the 48–215, Holden's first vehicle. Aside from the unique 18-inch alloy wheels, leather seat inserts, and "60th Anniversary" badging, the anniversary model is essentially identical to the Lumina in terms of both equipment and styling.
 International: sedans and Sportwagons entered production in mid-March 2009. Internationals are appointed with launch VE Calais V alloy wheels, front foglamps, a six-disc CD changer, leather upholstered trim and steering wheel, Bluetooth connectivity and rear park assist. Holden reintroduced the International in October 2009. Offered in sedan and Sportwagon body styles, the second iteration was fitted with the 3.0-litre SIDI V6 engine and six-speed automatic transmission; a 3.6-litre LPG Alloytec V6 engine with four-speed automatic transmission option was available for the sedan only. Extra features include 18-inch alloy wheels, Berlina front grille, leather seat trim and steering wheel, Bluetooth connectivity and rear park assist for the sedan (already standard on Sportwagons).
 Z Series: released on 5 September 2012 as a special edition Commodore. It was released to help boot the slowing sales of the VE range and to help send off the last model VE's before the VF was released. The Z Series combined luxury and sports features for great value. The models that had the Z badging were the Omega, SV6, SS and SS V. Features included leather seat trim (Omega and SS V), Bluetooth connect, rear parking sensors, rear parking camera, 18" WM Caprice alloys (Omega), rear lip spoiler, 19' alloys (SV6 and SS). The Sedan and Sportwagon came as Z Series, SV6 Z Series, SS Z Series and SS V Z Series. The Ute came with all except for the Omega-based Z Series model.

Commodore SV6 
Building on the Omega, the SV6 is equipped with the more powerful High Output variant of the Alloytec V6 engine, coupled to a six-speed manual or five-speed automatic transmission. Air conditioning, a key feature missing on the launch Omega, came standard on the SV6. A body kit and sports suspension similar to the V8 Commodore SS/SS V variants is also fitted. The SV6 sports the Performance interior look, an accentuated matte black centre console and red lighting, as opposed to the silver Functional-style interior of the Omega.
Thunder SV6 Ute The thunder SV6 ute received charcoal coloured 19-inch alloy wheels, satellite navigation, leather seat bolsters and Thunder badging.
SV6 Z Series Released on the 5th September 2012, the Z Series combined sportiness with luxury for maximum value. It was used to market off the final VE models before the launch of the VF and to promote the value of the Commodore due to slowing sales. The Z Series was mechanically the same as the standard SV6 but gained 19 inch charcoal alloy wheels, leather bolstered seats, Z Series badging, Z Series carpet, rear view camera and rear sensors. Full leather, satellite navigation, a tilt and slide sunroof and a full size spare were all optional extras offered with the Z Series.

Commodore VE SS 
Offering similar equipment levels to the SV6, the Commodore SS uses the 6.0-litre V8 engine and T-56 six-speed manual transmission. The SS is recognisable from its quad exhaust outlets in place of the SV6 dual outlets. The resulting specification level is much higher than the outgoing minimalist SV8 and only missing a few cosmetic touches of the previous flagship Commodore SS. Since its release, the SS has won two consecutive (2006 and 2007) Bang For Your Bucks awards,\Motor magazine initiative. The judges gave preference to the SS the second-time-round because ."

A more upmarket SS, the SS V-Series represents the first time this type of naming has been applied to Holden products. The V-Series naming is reminiscent of the V-badging on selected Cadillac models, another member of the GM family. The badge design on the bootlid bears strong resemblance to the ones used by Cadillac. But whereas Cadillac uses it to signify high-performance versions of its products, Holden V-Series variants boast extra features. The V-Series variants were introduced, largely due to a fully optioned Commodore SS in the VZ range being rather successful. The SS V offers extra luxuries at a similar price point to the preceding SS. Inside, it is recognisable by the metallic look pedals and instruments matched with the exterior colour. Additionally, the entire dashboard can be optioned in a range of loud colours: bright red, orange or black. The SS V exterior is equally adventurous, exhibiting five-spoke 19-inch alloy wheels and the option of larger 20-inch wheels: the largest wheels ever fitted to a Holden car.
 SS V 60th Anniversary: like the 60th Anniversary Omega-based edition, the SS V pack launched on 1 May 2008. Over the standard production SS V, the anniversary model added 10-spoke 20-inch alloy wheels, satellite navigation, rear parking sensors, a high-mounted rear spoiler, chrome exterior door handle highlights and "60th Anniversary" badging and floor mats.
 SS V-Series Special Edition: following the 2009 cancellation of Pontiac brand in North America, the Pontiac G8 front-end fascia and other trimmings were fitted to approximately 1,500 Commodore SS Vs. Unveiled at the 2009 Deniliquin ute muster on 2 October, sales began in November. Unlike the G8 which was only offered as a sedan, Holden issued utility, sedan and Sportwagon body variants of the Special Edition. Due to the popularity of the Pontiac-inspired SS V, Holden announced on 14 January 2010 that production would be extended until March 2010.
Thunder SS Ute Additional equipment over the standard SS were- 19-inch alloys, lowered sports suspension, excellent satnav with camera warning and traffic info', Bluetooth phone and audio and partial leather sports seats.

Berlina 
Priced lower than the outgoing model, the second tier Berlina retains a similar amount of equipment. The exterior styling is similar to the Omega but gaining extra touches such as larger tail-lights, front fog lamps and seven-spoke 17-inch alloy wheels. It features the Luxury-type interior with a large LCD centre display and is the only model in the VE range that features wood grain highlights. The VE series is the last one to feature this nameplate, first introduced in 1984 as a model variant and as a standalone nameplate in 1988 .
Berlina International: The Berlina International was based on the Series II Berlina but had a number of additional features. It was available as a sedan or wagon. It featured leather trim, 18-inch alloy wheels and a reversing camera.
Equipe: The Equipe was a luxury special edition Berlina released in 2011 under the Series II badge. It was based on the Berlina but also had many Calais features. In many ways it was similar to the previous limited edition Berlina International but was even better equipped. The car featured 18" Calais alloy rims, full leather Calais interior, fog lamps, rear parking sensors, rear view camera and came as a Sedan or Sportswagon model. The Sportwagon also featured a cargo blind. The car had $9600 of additional features. This special edition was limited to 7 colours and limited build numbers. The colours were Heron White, Sizzle, Karma, Nitrate, Alto Grey, Phantom and Mirage Glow. Satellite Navigation was available as an option.

Calais 
Like the Berlina, the Calais retains the features of the outgoing model but at a lower price point. Offering a blend of luxury and sporting character, it pairs the High Output Alloytec V6 engine of the SV6 with the five-speed automatic transmission. Unlike the previous model Calais which featured a semi-sport suspension setup known as FE1.5, the VE shares the Commodore SS/SS V stiff sports suspension. Like the SS, an upscale V-Series edition is available. Being the flagship of the Commodore range, it comes with everything the VE has to offer and serves as a stepping stone to the luxury long-wheelbase Statesman/Caprice range based on the VE. The Calais (as well as Berlina) are the only models in the range to feature larger tail-lights.
 Calais V International: Based on the Series I, the Calais V International was available with V6 or V8 and auto transmission. The model featured 19" alloy wheels, unique interior trim, chrome exterior door handles, colour satellite navigation and alloy faced pedals.
 Calais V 60th Anniversary: The Calais V 60th Anniversary Edition featured electronic sunroof and 19" alloy wheels. It also featured onyx/ light urban leather interior, alloy faced pedals and chrome exterior door handles.

HSV range (E Series) 

The enhanced performance VE range sold by Holden Special Vehicles (HSV) is marketed as the E Series and it comprised the variants listed below. For the first time, in order to more greatly differentiate its products from the mainstream donor cars, HSV invested in revised sheetmetal (chiefly, different front fender panels with dedicated air vent and different tail lights). E Series HSV vehicles have been the most successful and mass-produced vehicles in HSV's history.

Clubsport 
The E Series Clubsport R8 takes its fundamental body structure from the mainstream VE Commodore. It is also the standard model in the HSV line-up. With the deletion of lower lines of V8 HSV models the Clubsport slipped down to the entry level HSV V8, on a par with the Manta of the VR-VS-VT series. As such the sales of E Series Clubsports has been over shadowed by the sales of the E Series GTS.

The Original E-Series Clubsport was released in September 2006. The Clubsport had LED taillights and vertical front fender grilles only found on HSV E-Series models. Cloth trim was standard on Clubsport models with leather being an option.

In September 2008, the Clubsport R8 Tourer was released. The Tourer is a wagon version of the R8, based on the Sportwagon. From April 2008, all HSV models use 6.2 L LS3 V8s, instead of the previous LS2.

The HSV E Series 2 range was released 2010 and was the most major update since the release of E Series HSVs. Prices on the E2 Clubsport models started at $65,990 for the Clubsport R8 and $66,990 for the Clubsport R8 Tourer. The range received many cosmetic changes with new front and rear bumpers, twin-nostriled bonnet (from the Pontiac G8) and a new range of wheel designs. The Series 2 has a very distinctive looking set of daytime running lights standard across the E2 range. The new engines is the range are the  6.2 L LS3 V8 used exclusively by the HSV GTS, with the rest of the E2 range being powered by an LS3 in  trim. The new engines have also improved fuel economy by 4.2% on the LS3 V8. New is the intelligent launch controls, competition mode ESC and extended cruise control systems which are all standard for E2 models excluding intelligent launch control which is only available with a manual transmission.

HSV E Series 3 or E3 commenced sales in 2011. Model changes for the E series 3 include an option for LPI system (for an extra $5990) allowing the vehicle to run on LPG and unleaded petrol; the LPI system is not available on the ClubSport R8 Tourer. Cosmetic changes include a new spoiler and revised exhaust tips. HSV E Series 3 models reach  in 5.8 seconds. The HSV E Series 3 introduced the new HSV Enhanced Driver Interface; it has the same interface as the Holden IQ (found in VE Series II Commodores) but with added function. The system allows users to access the car's computer and monitor fuel consumption, stability, g-force and vehicle dynamics. Other functions include data logging options, digital gauge displays, stopwatch, driver and racing options, along with controls for the Grange's Bi-Modal exhaust and Side Blind-Zone Alert. The HSV Enhanced Driver Interface and satellite navigation is standard across the E series 3 range.

Vauxhall VXR8 

350 Vauxhall VXR8s per year were scheduled for official importation into the UK, at a price of £35,105. The LS3 V8 is particularly popular among tuners in the US, so performance parts are widely available. The supercharged Bathurst edition VXR8 was reviewed on Top Gear, and its power-lap time was 1 min 26.3 seconds, a similar time to the old BMW M5 E60.

In July 2010, Autocar reported that, "VXR8 was quietly dropped from the price lists several months ago" after stocks ran out. However, a facelifted version based on the new HSV E3 GTS was released to the UK market in April 2011 at a price of around £49,500, almost £15,000 more than the previous VXR8, but significantly cheaper than most of its rivals, like the Mercedes E63 AMG and BMW M5. Vauxhall has offered the 2011 Clubsport to UK customers as a special order model.

CSV CR8 
In 2007, the same model was exported to the Middle East badged as the CSV CR8, albeit in left hand drive. In this instance, CSV stands for "Chevrolet Special Vehicles", not to be confused with the unrelated, but also Holden Commodore-based Corsa Specialised Vehicles (CSV) cars.

GTS 
The fundamental underpinnings are based on the mainstream VE Commodore models of the same years. The car is powered by GM's 6.2-litre LS3 V8 engine, with a maximum power output of 442 PS (325 kW).

E Series 1

The major difference between the E-Series GTS and other HSV models in the range is the Magnetic Ride Control (MRC, or "MagneRide"). MRC utilises magnetorheological dampers to improve the car's handling and dynamics. In the GTS, the MRC can be switched between Performance and Track response modes at the touch of a button. MRC is not available on the Clubsport; it is standard equipment of the Senator, but switches between "Luxury" and "Performance", there is no "Track" mode like the GTS has.

HSV claims the braking performance of the GTS is better than some of the world's leading sports cars, including the BMW M5, Mercedes-Benz AMG CLS55 and Lamborghini Gallardo.

E Series 2

Released in September 2009, the E Series 2 HSV GTS incorporated a more powerful motor and drivetrain than other HSV models. It retains the same GM LS3 6.2L V8 engine but while the rest of the HSV range still have 317 kW or 425 bhp, the GTS engine is rated at (325 kW). Twin bonnet scoops have returned to this model from the styling of the Pontiac G8. Other changes include the availability of launch control on manual versions, a recalibrated version of the magnetic ride control suspension with stiffer springs for the HSV GTS, wider wheels and a new high-flow dual-mode muffler system that produces a throatier roar under heavy acceleration. The E-Series 2 stability control system also has a Competition setting which allows for more wheel slip for special track or motorsport applications. The cruise control brakes the car when it is travelling downhill to ensure its speed stays within one per cent of the set speed. This model has daytime running lights.

E Series 3

The E Series 3 was announced in September 2010. It carried the same motor and drivetrain as before, and only minor changes to the exterior. In this series HSV focused on changes to the interior of the car as well as major upgrades to the computer systems and a new electronic interface called the HSV Enhanced Driver Interface. External changes included the shock wave exhaust tips and grilles and new HID Xenon adaptive projector headlamps. The control panel changes included a new 'Oracle Dash' with upgraded trip computer, tire pressure monitors and fuel statistics; the center console was reworked, introducing the Holden touchscreen IQ system and the HSV EDI performance data logging system (similar to the Nissan GT-R), which displays real-time information on engine speed, brakes, gear shifts, g-forces on the car, steering angle, fuel economy, stability control, Magnetic Ride Control suspension, car dynamics, Bi-Modal Exhaust, battery voltage, oil pressure, power, torque, elevation, exhaust pressure, intake manifold pressure and air intake temp. The system includes preloaded race track locations, stop watches and track maps, satellite navigation, digital radio, Bluetooth, optional DVD player and ability to download data onto a PC using the Motech i2 software. The E Series 3 introduced (SBZA) Side Blind Zone Alert which uses ultrasonic sensors to alert drivers of traffic obstructions in blind spots. Using the HSV EDI the driver can customize operation of the car by for example turning off stability control and controlling the Bi-Modal Exhaust. The E Series 3 offered the option of HSV LPI (Liquid Propane Injection), an LPG Autogas system which allows the use of liquid propane as an alternative fuel. The LPI is controlled by the car's ECU and seamlessly changes from petrol to LPG when the engine has reached optimum temperature (when maximum engine power is required, the system automatically switches back to petrol).

Maloo 
The all-new E Series Maloo utility was a late arrival, released in October 2007, and only available as the Maloo R8. Refinements on the E Series include Electronic Stability Control, five-star ANCAP rating, and linear control suspension.

In August 2009, the facelifted E Series 2 was released which uses the same drivetrain as the W427 with an upgraded dual plate clutch not found on previous models. Late in the model run, HSV released the limited edition GXP sedan and Maloo GXP ute, being amalgams of HSV and Pontiac G8/ST components.

A mildly cosmetically altered E Series 3 was released in September 2010, and with it a special 20 years of Maloo edition limited to just 100 examples, featuring unique exterior equipment, including matte black 'Vector E' vents on the front guards and bonnet, 20-inch GTS alloy wheels, bi-modal exhaust system, Side Blind Zone Alert (SBZA), and new hero colours, including 'Hazard' yellow. The interior of the 20th anniversary Maloo features special leather upholstery, satellite navigation, Enhanced Driver Interface (EDI), and a specific rear window decal and numbered build plate.

Senator 

The development cost for the E Series Senator was more than the VT, VX, Y Series and the Z Series Senators combined. In general, the HSV Senator Signature is a significantly more upmarket form of the Holden Calais-V, with a matching pricetag.

The Senator is equipped with 19-inch, 10-spoke chrome shadow alloy wheels. The cabin features carbon fibre and imitation metal highlights. For the first time there are no visible wood grain trims that have featured in previous models. The development cost to redesign the rear taillights cost HSV $3 million. The designers of the Senator have also attempted to add a more of a luxury feel to the car instead of favouring the aggressive side. The entry level price for the Senator Signature is $76,990, down $4,000 from the previous model.

Like the E-series HSV GTS, the suspension is fitted with switchable Magnetic Ride Control (MRC, or "MagneRide") offering Luxury or Performance modes. It does this by electrically adjusting the viscosity of the ferrofluid inside the shock absorbers, producing different damping levels. Magnetic Ride Control also enhances braking by preventing forward weight transfer when the car is under heavy braking. The MRC system development took three years and cost HSV more than $4.5 million.

Standard gear includes climate control, Blaupunkt sound, cruise control, full trip computer, rear park assist, traction control system, Electronic Stability Control, power mirrors and windows. The oil, voltage and temperature gauges are now digital. The interior offers a choice of light urban beige, white or black for the colours. The carpets remain dark as in the Holden Calais V-Series. The Senator Signature also offers a number of options such as a roof mounted DVD player, front park assist, rain sensing wipers and door entry lamps. Satellite navigation will become available as an option in the near future.

From this MY09 model onwards, the Senator Signature was available with an optional 6-speed manual transmission. In early 2009, HSV introduced a base model Senator at the Melbourne Motor Show. This special model was priced from $69,990 (RRP) with just 30 manual and 59 auto examples produced. While it retained the look of the Signature model, it was essentially a ClubSport with a Senator body kit and did without many of the luxury features mentioned above as well as the MRC suspension, GTS-style seating and shadow chrome finish on the wheels.

In October 2009, HSV released their E2 model upgrades which introduced the "Shockwave" theme to the exterior of the Senator Signature. It was applied in a more subtle way than seen on the ClubSport, GTS and Maloo models with the front end receiving a new grille and some LED daytime running lights while the rear was fitted with the same style of lower body kit as the other sedan models. As with other models in the E2 range, the Senator Signature was available with the "SV Enhanced Options" bi-modal exhaust system and the 20" Pentagon wheel in place of a re-designed 19" wheel. There were no interior styling updates for the E2 model.

2010 saw the arrival of the E3 HSV range which brought with it a raft of interior changes shared with the VE Series II upgrade of HSV's donor vehicle, the Holden Commodore, such as the new Holden iQ audio/infotainment system and safety features such as Side Blind zone alert. It also brought HSV's Enhanced Driver Interface (EDI) system to the Senator, a system that constantly streams real-time vehicle dynamics and performance information to the touch screen in the centre console. The exterior remained mostly unchanged from the E2 model apart from the move to a 20" forged alloy that was available in Dark Stainless or Gloss Black. The E3 was also available with the upgraded 6-piston brakes from the GTS and had the option of a modern LPG fuel system called LPI (Liquid Propane Injection) to help reduce the running costs.

Senator SV08 

This was a limited edition of 50 vehicles released in late 2008 in the "MY09.5" model year. It was released alongside the limited edition 40 Years GTS. It was primarily to commemorate 20 years since the release of the SV88, one of the first vehicles released by the then new HSV outfit. There were 20 manuals (the first of the general run HSV E Series to use the TR6060 6 speed manual that had only been used in the W427 prior – straight from the current Corvette) and 30 autos. They were released in only 3 colours, Nitrate (silver) Sting (red) & Voodoo (blue). It was also the first VE model Senator to be officially released with a manual. Equipment levels & drivetrain were identical to the Senator Signature of the time. Unique features of the SV08 are: SV08 badging, 20" Pentagon wheels, lower body gloss black accenting (ran along the doors at the same level of the black accenting on the front & rear), chrome mirror head & door handle accents, SV08 sill plates & SV08 build plate.

W427 

The HSV W427 is the limited edition flagship of the initial E Series range by automobile manufacturer Holden Special Vehicles, released in celebration of the company's 20th anniversary in 2008, but produced until 2009.

The W427 is based on the Holden VE Commodore, but powered by the 7.0L LS7 V8.
It features recalibrated Magnetic Ride Control (MRC, or "MagneRide") and stiffer suspension settings than the HSV GTS, as well as a toughened 6-speed manual gearbox, a new exhaust system, larger 6-piston brakes, and strengthened limited-slip differential.

The W427's name is the result of a combination of factors. W is to honour the founder of HSV, Tom Walkinshaw. The 427 is simply the engine capacity in cubic inches, but it is also a nod to the HRT 427C, which won the 2002 and 2003 Bathurst 24 Hour motor races.

Consumer interest for production of the W427 actually began with the still-born HRT 427 Coupe of 2002, based on the Holden Monaro. The original W427 concept car was produced in the same body colour as the very first HSV model, the VL Commodore SS Group A SV.

The production version HSV W427 sedan was announced in August 2008 and retailed for A$155,500 (EUR€90920) without optional equipment. Additional cost options amounted to three items : Electric Glass Sunroof, Satellite Navigation, and Rear Passenger Overhead DVD Player. Production was originally intended as a limited run of 427 cars. However, only 137 cars were built (this number does not include the original concept car), sold only in Australia and New Zealand (only three cars were exported to NZ).

Reportedly, Holden Special Vehicles offered the pre-order of build no. 427 (uniquely painted in "Panorama" silver) to a Cairns Monaro collector, who purchased the 2002 HRT 427 coupe for $920,000 in 2008. The last W427 to be built was made to order in July 2009, being build no. 137 in "Heron" white, sold by Shacks HSV in Fremantle, Western Australia, and personally signed by Tom Walkinshaw.

The HSV W427 will be noted in TWR / HSV history as the only car to which Tom Walkinshaw 'personally' attached his name. It was not the first Holden Commodore-based vehicle to be powered by a 7.0L LS7 V8 engine as that honour went to the more affordable Corsa Specialised Vehicles GTS.

 Total production by colour option

* includes 2 Panorama (silver metallic) and 1 Lamborghini green (metallic) units.

Model year changes 

Like the VZ model before it, Holden with the VE have continued to moderate the long-standing tradition of implementing substantial updates marked by the frequent use of new model designations (such and VT, VX, and VY) successively interspersed with "Series II" and occasional "Series III" revisions. Holden have also implemented a series of running changes over VE's lifetime, signified by the model year (MY):

 MY08: models came in April 2007. The horizontal wood grain key line across the dash on the Berlina was replaced by a matte silver insert. Also, the recessed buttons on the Omega key fob were now raised and made of a more durable plastic. This did not affect the remaining variants, fitted with the "flip-out" key fob from launch.

 MY08.5: changes from August 2007 coincided with launch of the VE Ute.

 MY09: models were launched on Saint Crispin's Day (Scott Weedon's Birthday) 2008. Six airbags were made standard across the range—Omega and SV6 variants were previously fitted with two and four airbags respectively. Omega models also received standard fitment of air conditioning, 16-inch alloy wheels, body colour wing mirrors and door handles, and a new grille insert with chrome highlights. Revised alloy wheel designs were featured on the Calais (seven-spoke) and Calais V (10-spoke).

 MY09.5: upgrades affected models ordered from 21 October 2008 and produced from November. Instrument cluster illumination was commonised to white. The turn-by-turn navigation and Berlina V8 options were removed. Engine wise, the "premium" version of the Alloytec V6 was now fitted to the Omega and Berlina, bringing improved fuel consumption and a slight reduction in engine output (see above). A range of safety upgrades were also introduced (see above). Further MY09.5 changes were introduced in March 2009. The space-saver spare wheel were discontinued and replaced by two no-cost options: either a lightweight tyre inflator kit or a full-size spare wheel (previously an extra cost). Sportwagon variants of the Calais V and SS V receive an alloy spare wheel if the full-size spare is chosen, while the remainder of the line-up receives a steel wheel spare. March also signalled an opportunity for Holden to replace the dark-grey horizontal dashboard strip and steering wheel spokes as used on the SV6, SS and SS V to a matte silver type. The safety improvements made to the Omega sedan from October production onwards were also introduced for the Omega Sportwagon (see above), and the "V-Series" insignia used on SS V and Calais V models was removed, replaced by a single "SS V" or "Calais V" badge.

 MY10: versions of the VE were released in September 2009. New 3.0-litre and 3.6-litre V6s have been introduced, featuring Spark Ignition Direct Injection (SIDI) and coupled to a new six-speed automatic transmission (see above). These revised powertrains are marketed as part of Holden's EcoLine range. Visually, all SIDI versions are distinguished by relocated and additional EcoLine badging. 3.0-litre versions now utilise twin exhaust outlets. Updated cars also gain a recalibrated suspension setup and an extra ball-joint in the rear suspension (previously introduced on the Sportwagon); the result is increased tautness and improved handling in models fitted with 18 and 19-inch diameter wheels. These cars are also equipped with a larger  rear stabiliser bar. Additional engine bay sound deadening and a new muffler have resulted in reduced noise, vibration, and harshness. Elsewhere, the fitment of lighter low rolling-resistance tyres aids fuel consumption by minimising friction. The MY10 model year also saw the introduction of the Tremec TR-6060 6-speed manual transmission and higher specification clutch for all V8 models.

Series II 

 MY11: revisions to the styling identify this update, marketed by Holden as the "Series II". Announced on 31 August 2010, and launched on 10 September, MY11 heralded styling changes across the range by way of new front fascias, the addition of aerodynamic lip detailing to the decklids of sedans, and new alloy wheel designs on the Berlina specification and higher. Front-end changes comprise partially reshaped headlamps, redesigned bumpers, and an enlarged grille with restyled inserts that differ throughout the model range. Inside, the interiors receive a redesigned centre console stack incorporating a new 6.5-inch touchscreen, new dashboard, rearranged controls, reconfigured ventilation outlets, and updates to trimmings and illumination colours. SV6, SS and SS V interiors are differentiated via the application of circular air vents. Standard on all models is the 6.5-inch infotainment system developed primarily by Siemens VDO. Dubbed "Holden-iQ", this integrates media playback and control functions. The iQ head unit replaces the previous mechanical CD stacker with a single slot and built in storage for approximately 15 CDs worth of music (internal storage optional on the Omega). The system also features full iPod integration, USB and auxiliary input, and incorporates Bluetooth handsfree telephone compatibility and music streaming. On V-Series specifications, iQ incorporates satellite navigation with live traffic updates, speed zone alerts and traffic camera notification. Sedans and wagons specified with navigation also receive a reversing camera.In terms of powertrain, the MY11 brought flex-fuel capability for the 3.0-litre V6 and 6.0-litre V8, allowing them to run on E85 bio-ethanol (see above). With the MY11 update, Holden also introduced a new "Redline" sports package as an option on V-Series models. The package includes lightweight, forged and polished 19-inch multi-spoke alloy wheels from the Pontiac G8 GXP. Other Redline additions encompass four-piston Brembo high-performance brakes, stiffer "FE3" suspension and chromed window surrounds for sedans, and the fitment of the tyre inflater kit on the Redline Ute.

 MY12: Holden commenced production of the MY12 update Commodore on 6 September 2011. This followed Holden's 2 September announcement that mechanical changes would be limited to efficiency improvements and the implementation of E85 compatibility for the 3.6-litre SIDI V6. As part of the cosmetic update, the Omega gained new seven-spoke 16-inch alloy wheels and chrome highlights for the lower outboard fascia inserts, while the Berlina received new chrome highlighted foglight surrounds. The Calais V added a new boot lip spoiler, which was available as an accessory for other MY12 sedans. SV6 and SS models score a new chrome-highlighted lower airdam and front grille surround, with V-Series versions of the SS acquiring additional chrome-accented lower outboard inserts. Redline editions of the SS V gain redesigned 19-inch wheels, red painted brake calipers, and the fitment of "FE3" suspension was extended to the Sportwagon and Ute variants.

Production 

At the time of launch in Australia, Ford's BF Falcon directly competed with the VE Commodore. In November 2006 Toyota released their key Aurion model to the Australian market. The front-wheel drive Mitsubishi 380 also indirectly competed with the Holden Commodore, but was discontinued with the 2008 closure of the Mitsubishi Motors Australia plant in Tonsley Park, South Australia.

The VE Commodore was well received in the Australian market, where it had consistently outsold rivals in the large car segment. The VE's position as Australia's outright best selling car was challenged in 2007 and overtaken during some months in 2008 by the Toyota Corolla in the face of increasing petrol prices. However, the release of the Sportwagon in mid-2008 has helped to reestablish its number one sales position by accounting for more than 30 percent of total Commodore sales. In 2007 the VE Commodore became the fifth Commodore model to receive the Wheels Car of the Year award.

The last VE produced was a Commodore SS V automatic sedan, painted Chlorophyll green and destined for a Northern Territory dealer. Since July 2006, Holden produced more than 520,000 units of which 350,000 were sold in Australia.

The following table lists the sales of the VE Commodore over its tenure.

Exports 
The full Holden VE range was exported and sold to New Zealand, whereas in the Middle East and South Africa it was re-branded as the Chevrolet Lumina. Sales of the Berlina began in 2007 for Brazilian market as the Chevrolet Omega. Pontiac in North America also imported Commodore sedans from 2008 through to 2009 as the G8. The G8's cessation was a consequence of GM's Chapter 11 bankruptcy resulting in the demise of the Pontiac brand. Unlike the Chevrolet Lumina and Omega, the Pontiac G8 received several unique features including a revised L76 engine with Active Fuel Management as opposed to the Commodore's L98, and appearance changes.

Bitter Vero Sport 

In 2009, the small-scale German manufacturer, Bitter, which specializes in rebodying existing vehicles, unveiled its "Vero Sport" at the Geneva Motor Show. It was based on the Commodore SS and its production ended in 2012.

Motorsport

Due to its larger dimensions than the previous VZ, the VE had to have major areas of the bodywork redesigned to fit the mandatory chassis size of V8 Supercars. The Holden Commodore VE made its official debut in the V8 Supercar Championship Series in 2007 with Garth Tander and the HSV Dealer Team winning the championship. It also won the 2011 and 2012 series with Jamie Whincup and Triple Eight Race Engineering. It won the Bathurst 1000 four times; 2009 and 2011 with  the Holden Racing Team and 2010 and 2012 with Triple Eight Race Engineering. It won a total of 103 races.

Notes

References

Works cited

External links 

Cars of Australia
Full-size vehicles
ANCAP executive cars
VE
Rear-wheel-drive vehicles
Station wagons
Coupé utilities
Police vehicles
Sports sedans
Cars introduced in 2006
2010s cars